Cambaroides similis is a species of crayfish endemic to the Korean Peninsula and neighbouring parts of China.

References

Cambaridae
Freshwater crustaceans of Asia
Crustaceans described in 1892